Euthore is a genus of damselflies in the family Polythoridae. There are about eight described species in Euthore.

Species
These eight species belong to the genus Euthore:
 Euthore fasciata (Hagen in Selys, 1853) i c g
 Euthore fassli Ris, 1914 i c g
 Euthore fastigiata (Selys, 1859) i
 Euthore hyalina (Selys, 1853) i c g
 Euthore inlactea Calvert, 1909 i c g
 Euthore leroii Ris, 1918 i c g
 Euthore meridana Selys, 1879 i g
 Euthore mirabilis McLachlan, 1878 i c g
Data sources: i = ITIS, c = Catalogue of Life, g = GBIF, b = Bugguide.net

References

Further reading

 
 
 
 
 
 
 

Damselflies